Mannahouse Church (formerly City Bible Church) is a non-denominational Christian megachurch located in Portland, Oregon, U.S. Their five campuses have six English services, three Spanish services, one Burmese service and multiple other international groups. Their Rocky Butte Campus serves as their headquarters. Mannahouse Church is Nondenominational and is not connected with or a part of any particular denomination.

History 
The church started as a group of 13 people in 1951. The church grew rapidly, soon starting a Bible college, tape ministry, a Christian school and a Publishing house. In 2003, a second campus was opened in Tigard, soon followed by campuses in Vancouver, Washington and Downtown Portland and then a church they had planted in Eugene, Oregon became a campus. In 2018, the church changed its name from City Bible Church to Mannahouse Church to "better reflect the role that God has called us to in our time and culture."

Beliefs 
Mannahouse is a Trinitarian, Evangelical church. Some specific beliefs include the following:

 Baptism by immersion
 Biblical infallibility
 Traditional marriage
 Spiritual gifts
 Divine healing
 Communion (The Lord's Supper)

They also believe in Church autonomy and believe that Presbyterian polity with a lead pastor "who all qualify on the basis of 1 Timothy 3 in spiritual life, character, domestic life and ruling ability," is the correct way of church governance.

Church Organization

Ministries 

 Children's Ministry
 Youth Ministry
 Young Adults Ministry
 Senior's Ministry

Music 
Mannahouse Worship is a creative community at Mannahouse that express worship to Jesus through music and diverse types of arts.

Livestream 
Mannahouse Church offers a livestreamed service at 10:00am from their Rocky Butte Campus.

Foreign Language Services 
Mannahouse Church offers Spanish services at their Tigard, Rocky Butte and Vancouver campuses.

Community Relations 
Mannahouse Church participates in many community functions and also serves as a community center and emergency shelter.

Mannahouse church, in contrast to the above statements, has locks on all doors

Music School 
Mannahouse operates a music school.

Campuses 
Mannahouse Church operates the following campuses:

 Portland: Rocky Butte (Headquarters)
 Portland: Downtown
 Tigard
 Vancouver
 Eugene

Schools 
Main Articles: Mannahouse Christian Academy and Portland Bible College

Mannahouse Church operates a Christian School adjacent to their Rocky Butte Campus called Mannahouse Christian Academy (formerly City Christian Schools). They also operate the Portland Bible College.

See also 

 List of the largest churches in the US
 Religion in Oregon
 Religion in Washington (state)

References 

Churches in Portland, Oregon